Matfors IF is a Swedish football club located in Matfors.

Background
Matfors Idrottsförening is a Swedish sports club situated in Matfors in Sundsvall Municipality, Västernorrland County. It was founded in 1901 under the name of Thule skidklubb (Thule Skiing club). In 1916 the name was changed to Matfors IF. The club is currently active in football (men's and women's soccer), skiing and tennis.

Matfors IF currently plays in Division 4 Medelpad which is the sixth tier of Swedish football. They play their home matches at the Thulevallen in Matfors.

The club is affiliated to Medelpads Fotbollförbund.  Matfors IF played in the 2010 Svenska Cupen but lost 0–2 at home to Friska Viljor FC in the preliminary round.

Season to season

Footnotes

External links
 Matfors IF – Official website

Sport in Västernorrland County
Football clubs in Västernorrland County
1901 establishments in Sweden